Karl Friedrich Ludwig von Watzdorf (1 September 1759 – 16 May 1840) was a Saxon general and diplomat.
He was born in Plauen and fought in the French Revolutionary Wars from 1793 to 1796. When in 1806 Saxony supported Napoleon, he took part in battles on the French side.

Watzdorf was an envoy in 1812 and 1813 in Vienna, where he signed a treaty of alliance with Austria on behalf of Saxony, which no longer supported the French. He acted as an intermediary from 1813 to 1815 between Dresden and Berlin, where he was imprisoned by Saxon king Frederick Augustus I of Saxony. Unsuccessfully sought his release, then sent the same request to the rulers of Prussia, Russia, and Austria, also to no avail. He later toured London, Frankfurt, and Paris, arguing that Saxony was not an enemy of the victorious countries, and entered into an alliance with Napoleon of necessity. He gave a great contribution to restoring Saxon relations with coalition countries.

Later he was entrusted with the education of successors to the Saxon throne.

He served as envoy from 1827 to 1834 in Berlin, where in 1834 signed a customs contract with Prussia, upon which was built after the German Customs Union (Zollverein). In 1835, Watzdorf was appointed Minister of the Royal House. He died in Dresden.

Family
Watzdorf married Marie, Baroness von Sticks who died in 1800. In 1804 he married Charlotte Henriette Gräfin von Hopffgarten (died 1864). He had 3 daughters and three sons, of whom Anton a  Prussian lieutenant-colonel, fell at the Battle of Waterloo.

Notes

1759 births
1840 deaths
People from Plauen
Lieutenant generals of Saxony
German military personnel of the Napoleonic Wars
German diplomats